Grand National Alliance may refer to:
Grand National Alliance (Guatemala)
Grand National Alliance (Iran)
Grand National Alliance (Dominican Republic)